Hyochang Park is a park in Yongsan Districtof Seoul, South Korea. It was originally the cemetery of royal noble consort Ui of the Seong clan (hangul: 의빈 성씨), her only son (and King Jeongjo's first son) Crown Prince Munhyo (hangul: 문효세자), and of the Sugeui Park clan (hangul: 숙의 박씨), and was known at that time as Hyochangwon. The Japanese Empire developed Hyochangwon into a park in 1924 and the Japanese Governor-General assigned Hyochangwon park status in 1940. At the end of the era of the Japanese colonization of Korea, as the grave of the Crown Prince Munhyo was forced to be moved to the royal tomb of Sepsam, Hyochangwon became Hyochang Park.

The remains of three presidents of the Provisional Government of the Republic of Korea are interred at Hyochang Park: Lee Bong-Chang (이봉창; 李奉昌), Yoon Bong-Gil (윤봉길; 尹奉吉) and Baek Jeong-Gi (백정기, 白貞基), whose graves are known as the Graves of the Three Martyrs (삼의사묘, 三義士墓). There is a temporary burial mound for An Jung-geun (1946), and Kim Gu was also buried at Hyochang Park after his death in 1949. Since then, the area has contained the graves of several independence activists.

A memorial ceremony is held every year on 13 April, the anniversary of the establishment of the provisional government. The park was designated as a historical landmark in 1989. In addition to the graves of patriotic martyrs, the park contains such amenities as a children's playground, sports facilities, the Kim Koo Museum and a senior citizens' association.

External links
Parks of Seoul
용산 문화광장 
대한민국 구석구석 

Parks in Seoul
Yongsan District